Jategaon is a village in Nashik taluka in Nashik district of state of Maharashtra, India. Jategaon belongs to Madhe Maharastra and Northern Maharashtra region and Nashik Division. The village is located 116 km towards East from District headquarters Nashik.

Geographics 

Demographics 
The Jategaon village had population of 5636 of which 2915 are males while 2721 are females as per Population Census 2011.

See also
 Villages in Parner taluka

References 

Villages in Parner taluka
Villages in Ahmednagar district